Events from the year 2003 in Nepal.

Incumbents
Monarch : King Gyanendra
Prime Minister: Lokendra Bahadur Chand (until 3 June), Surya Bahadur Thapa (starting 3 June)
Chief Justice: Kedar Nath Upadhyaya

Events

January
 January 26 - Armed Police Force Inspector General of Police Krishna Mohan Shrestha is killed along with his wife and bodyguard by Maoists.
 January 29 - The Maoists and the government announce a cease fire.

August
 August 27 - Maoists unilaterally withdraw from the cease fire.

September
 September 7 - Nepalese Civil War: Journalist Gyanendra Khadka is killed by Maoist insurgents.
 September 13 - Miss Nepal beauty contest is held.  The winner is Priti Sitoula of Kathmandu.

Births

October 16 – Princess Kritika of Nepal

Deaths
 January 25 – Krishna Mohan Shrestha

References

 
Years of the 21st century in Nepal
Nepal
2000s in Nepal
Nepal